Urudhi Mozhi is a 1990 Indian Tamil-language action adventure film, directed by R. V. Udayakumar and produced by Ravi Yadav. The film stars Prabhu, Geetha, Sivakumar and Bharathi. It was released on 1 December 1990, and became Udayakumar's third consecutive box office success.

Plot

Cast 
Prabhu as Arun
Shanthini as Suganthi
Sivakumar as Dr. Chandrasekar
Geetha
Jai Ganesh
Bharathi as Abirami
Janagaraj as Jangan
Sarathkumar as Legal
Anandaraj as Enemy role
Sharath Saxena
Pandu as Pattu

Soundtrack 
The music was composed by Ilaiyaraaja.

Reception 
The Indian Express wrote, "The choice of locales, the stunts enacted and the technical finesse of the film, make it an effective action adventure".

References

External links 
 

1990 films
1990s action adventure films
1990s Tamil-language films
Films directed by R. V. Udayakumar
Films scored by Ilaiyaraaja
Indian action adventure films